Phaenicophilidae is a family of passerine birds. It consists of three genera and four species, all endemic to Hispaniola, which have been traditionally placed in the families Thraupidae (Phaenicophilus) and Parulidae (Xenoligea, Microligea).

Species

References

 
Passeriformes
Higher-level bird taxa restricted to the West Indies
Bird families
Taxa named by Philip Sclater